Mount Natib  is a dormant stratovolcano and caldera complex in the province of Bataan on western Luzon Island of the Philippines.  The volcano complex occupies the northern portion of the Bataan Peninsula.  The mountain and adjacent surrounding is a protected area first declared as the Bataan National Park in 1945.

Physical features

Mount Natib is a stratovolcano type of volcano topped by a  acorn-shaped Natib Caldera that is open to the northwest. The highest peak of Mount Natib has an elevation of  asl and is at the point of convergence of the two calderas.

Volcanic activity
There are no historical eruptions within the Natib caldera complex. Studies in 1991 (Panum and Rayem) indicate that the last eruptive activity was probably Holocene to upper Pleistocene.  An earlier study in 1971 (Ebasco Services) dated the eruptive products between 69,000 +/- 27,000 years old.  A recent study by Dr. Kevin Rodolfo of the Department of Earth and Environmental Sciences at the University of Illinois at Chicago, had Mount Natib's latest eruption between 11,000 and 18,000 years ago after studying a prehistoric pyroclastic flow from the volcano that entered Subic Bay in Zambales province.
Current activity on Natib is through five thermal areas.  The hot springs in the Natib caldera are Asin, Mamot, Tigulangin, Uyong, and Paipit springs.  The hot springs have temperatures ranging from 30-56 °C, with low flows, and a neutral to slightly alkaline water discharge.

The Philippine Institute of Volcanology and Seismology (PHIVOLCS) lists Mount Natib as a potentially active volcano.

Geology
The rocks found on Natib are predominantly biotite, hornblende, andesite, trending to dacite flows and dacitic tuffs, which are similar to Mount Mariveles, the southern half of the Bataan Peninsula.

Natib is part of the Western Bataan Lineament volcanic belt, which includes the active Mount Pinatubo.

See also
 List of active volcanoes in the Philippines
 List of potentially active volcanoes in the Philippines
 List of inactive volcanoes in the Philippines
 Pacific Ring of Fire

References

External links
Philippine Institute of Volcanology and Seismology (PHIVOLCS), Natib page
Smithsonian Institution's Global Volcanism Program, Natib page

Natib
Natib
Natib
Natib
Landforms of Bataan
Natib
Natib
Pleistocene stratovolcanoes